Carlos Canal Blanco (born 28 June 2001 in Xinzo de Limia) is a Spanish cyclist, who currently rides for UCI ProTeam .

Major results

Cyclo-cross
2017–2018
 1st  National Junior Championships
2018–2019
 1st  National Junior Championships
 7th UCI Junior World Championships

Mountain bike
2018
 2nd Cross-country, National Junior Championships
2019
 1st  Cross-country, National Junior Championships

Road
2021 
 7th Vuelta a Murcia
2022
 1st  Mountains classification, Tour de Bretagne
2023
 6th Trofeo Calvia
 7th Trofeo Ses Salines–Alcúdia

Grand Tour general classification results timeline

References

External links

2001 births
Living people
Spanish male cyclists
Sportspeople from the Province of Ourense
Cyclists at the 2018 Summer Youth Olympics
Cyclo-cross cyclists
Cyclists from Galicia (Spain)